The Petone Rugby Football Club was founded in 1885 and has been the Wellington Premier Champion 39 times between 1895 and 2005. In addition, the club has won the Club Championship on 42 occasions between 1922 and 2005. Petone is a constituent club of the Wellington Rugby Football Union.

Location
The Petone Club rooms are at the lower end of the Hutt Valley on a site in Udy Street. The Clubrooms stand immediately adjacent to North Park, a field maintained to the highest standards even though it is only used for training.

Other Club facilities include:
 Outdoor training - floodlit fields at North Park and on Petone Recreation ground on the other side of Udy Street.
 A large indoor Tiger Turf Stadium capable of use by a full forward pack and backline in training.
 Two large and well equipped changing and showering rooms.
 A modern and very well equipped weights room.
 A large modern fully heated lounge with full bar and kitchen facilities.
 Extensive collection of memorabilia from around the World.

Club membership
Club membership in 2013 totalled more than 750, made up of life members, vice presidents, honorary members, open and age grade players and 412 young players in the junior section ranging from 4 and 5 year olds in the nursery grade to 12 year olds. The club fields nine teams in the Wellington Union's 2013 competition grades from Premier to Colts U21.

The club funds a coaching coordinator, Darren 'Lardy' Larsen. Lardy is a highly qualified and competent coach. He also runs the Konnect Blue programme that allows juniors leaving for college to stay in touch with the club until they return.

Reputation
The club has produced 30 All Blacks and 16 NZ Maori representatives.

Tana Umaga became an All Black in 1997 and played continuously for his country before his retirement in 2006, becoming captain in 2004. Andy Leslie, the current NZ Rugby Union Vice President, was the club's first appointed All Black touring captain to Britain (1974) and South Africa (1976).

Notable players
Allan Hewson – All Black
Neemia Tialata – All Black
Tana Umaga – All Black captain
Andy Leslie – All Black captain
Ken Gray – All Black
Hercules Richard Wright – Kiwi
Daniel Fraser – Kiwi
Edward Tyne – Kiwi
Tom Cross – All Black & Kiwi
Arthur Kelly – Kiwi
Duncan McGregor – All Black & Kiwi
Riki Flutey – England
Mark Nicholls – All Black

History
Petone had a four-year reign as Premier Champions between 1904 and 1907 and the Club set a memorable record in the 1907 season when it won all championship grades in the Wellington competition. After the 1907 season the club was weakened by inadvertently helping the formation of rugby league in New Zealand. The club provided six players for the professional 1907-1908 rugby tour of Great Britain including its two All Blacks at the time, Tom Cross and Duncan McGregor, and the club's captain, Hercules Wright.
The New Zealand Rugby Union subsequently banned all members of the tour for life.

In the 1971 season the Premier team won the Premier competition and the Jubilee Cup for the fifth consecutive season and became the first club in the history of Wellington rugby to achieve this feat since the club competition was commenced in 1868. The first three wins in this sequence were achieved under the leadership of Ken Gray widely considered one of the greatest All Black prop forwards in the history of the game. The Ken Gray Academy was established in 1995 in Ken's name to assist in the development of the best young players wishing to find their way through the Club to the highest representative honours.

The centennial history records that Te Puni arrived in the Hutt Valley in 1817 and died there in 1870. In the first official match ever played by the Petone Club three descendants of Te Puni were included in the fifteen. Today Petone Rugby is a multi-cultural mix in a family-oriented environment. The club always welcomes visitors to come and share its hospitality.

In November 2006, the club hosted The World Golden Oldies Festival and in 2010 the Club celebrated its 125th Anniversary.

Monogram
The Club adopted its familiar monogram on the recommendation of its illustrious Life Member and Maori All Black, Matt Love, as part of its 50th Jubilee celebrations in 1935. The monogram is embellished by the words in Maori "kia kaha kia maia" - broadly translated as "give of your best - be confident in your own ability". This reflects the strength of the partnership with Maori in the Club.
The monogram was updated in 2010 to include "Est 1885" and the words "Petone Rugby Club".

References

New Zealand rugby union teams
1885 establishments in New Zealand
Rugby clubs established in 1885
Sport in Lower Hutt